Sabino Fernández Campo, 1st Count of Latores (March 17, 1918, Oviedo - October 26, 2009, Madrid) was Head of the Royal Household of Spain under Juan Carlos I, from 1990 to 1993, and a key figure during the failed 23-F coup d'état in 1981.

In the Spanish Civil War he fought in a militia of the Falangists against the Republicans. In 1959 he was appointed as military secretary under dictator Francisco Franco.

On 30 April 1992 Fernández was raised into the Spanish nobility by Royal decree of King Juan Carlos I and was given the hereditary title conde de Latores (English: Count of Latores), together with the dignity Grande de España (English: Grandee of Spain). After his death in 2009 his daughter María Elena Fernández inherited the titles.

Honours 

  Knight Grand Cross of the Order of Charles III (08/01/1993).

Notes

External links
Daily Telegraph: Sabino Fernández Campo, Count of Latores obituary 

Counts of Spain
People from Oviedo
1918 births
2009 deaths
Grandees of Spain